William Somerville was  Archdeacon of Armagh from 1426 to 1427:

He was appointed Rector of Phillipstown in 1430 and a Canon of Armagh from 1440 to 1455.

Notes

Archdeacons of Armagh
15th-century Irish Roman Catholic priests